NGC 177 is an unbarred spiral galaxy with a distinct ring structure, located around 200 million light-years away in the constellation Cetus. It was discovered in 1886 by Frank Muller.

References

External links
 

0177
002241
MCG objects
Cetus (constellation)
Unbarred spiral galaxies